Channel Rainbow 12, is an Israeli free-to-air television channel owned by Keshet Media Group. It launched on 1 November 2017 as one of two replacements of the outgoing Channel 2.

History 
Israel's Channel 2 was operated by the Second Authority for Television and Radio, but was programmed by two rotating companies, Keshet Media Group and Reshet. As part of a larger series of reforms to Israel's broadcast system to increase diversity and competition, Channel 2 was shut down, and both concessionaires were granted their own, standalone channels; Keshet 12 officially launched on 1 November 2017, alongside Reshet 13. Programs were divided among the two channels. The Israel Television News Company continued to provide news programmes for both channels, with the main primetime bulletin simulcast by both channels, until 16 January 2019 when HaHadashot 12 was established after the merger of Reshet 13 and Channel 10.

See also 
List of programs broadcast by Channel 2 (Israel)
List of television channels in Israel
HaHadashot 12

References

External links

 Live stream by Keshet Media Group

2017 establishments in Israel
Hebrew-language mass media
Mass media in Tel Aviv
Television channels and stations established in 2017
Television channels in Israel